M.R. Mathias is an American author whose notable works include The Wardstone Trilogy, the Dragoneer Saga, The Legend of Vanx Malic fantasy adventure series, and Crimzon & Clover Short Short Series. His most recent work is a four book epic fantasy series called "Fantastica."

History
Michael Robb Mathias was born in the outskirts of Oklahoma City. In 1987 he graduated from high school and received a scholarship in creative writing. He attended East Central University in Oklahoma studying under the scholarship, and went on to study creative writing at University of Oklahoma. After college, he took up work in the steel industry, initially for TG Steel and then for a company owned by Ross Perot called DPR Construction. During 2000-2004 he participated in the building of the Alliance Parkway.

Struggling with drug addiction, he spent several years in a Texas prison for minor drug possession. While incarcerated, M.R. Mathias spent his time reading nearly every book in the prison library. It was during this time that he turned his energy toward writing. He wrote several full length novels in longhand, without the luxury of spell check, or word processors, or even a dictionary. Since his release, he has devoted every effort to maintaining himself clean and free from addiction. He says: "Writing was my salvation. I was on a Maximum Security Unit for a while, over a few fights. I was in a modern dungeon cell 23 hours a day, everyday. Every word on every page of The Wardstone Trilogy was a moment of freedom I created for myself."

After prison, he moved to Houma Louisiana to take care of his aging grandmother who was suffering from Alzheimer's disease. He spent his time taking care of her while entering his longhand novels into a word processor. It was during this time that he also began writing The Dragoneer Saga. After his grandmother's passing, his mother retired from her professorship and learned she had cancer. He moved back to Oklahoma in 2011 to assist her with her treatments at Integris Treatment Center. In 2014 she was listed as terminal and entered hospice care during the summer of 2016. He remained by her side until her death on January 16, 2017. He went on to assemble several charity anthologies to benefit other cancer victims and their families.

In 2010, The Royal Dragoneers, book one of The Dragoneer Saga, was nominated for the Locus Poll award. Also in 2010, The Dragoneer Sage Book One and The Wardstone Trilogy Book One were listed on a report by Publishers Weekly titled, Introducing PW Select's Self-Publishing Listings.

Blood and Royalty, book six of The Dragoneer Saga, was released December 21, 2014.

In late 2017 M.R. Mathias released the four-book Fantastica series which he'd written in longhand in the 1990s, forgotten, and then found in a box in his mother's closet.

In 2018 M.R. Mathias began releasing books from his newest series Dragon Racers.

Bibliography
 The Dragoneers Saga
 The Wardstone Trilogy
 The Legend of Vanx Malic
 Fantastica
 Dragon Racers

References

External links
 
 Author's Den Page

American writers
1969 births
Living people